The 1981–82 Liga Bet season saw Maccabi Bnei Hatzor, Hapoel Nahliel, Tzafririm Holon and Ironi Ashdod win their regional divisions and promoted to Liga Alef.

At the bottom, Maccabi Neve Sha'anan, Beitar Nahariya (from North A division), Maccabi Fureidis, Maccabi HaSharon Netanya (from North B division), Hapoel Ganei Tikva, Hapoel Kiryat Shalom (from South A division), Hapoel Bnei Zion and Hapoel Mevaseret Zion (from South B division) were all automatically relegated to Liga Gimel.

North Division A

North Division B

South Division A

South Division B

Hapoel Mevaseret Zion suspended from the league and demoted to Liga Gimel.

References
Who will be relegated from North B? (Page 7) Hadshot HaSport, 16.5.82, archive.football.co.il 

Liga Bet seasons
Israel
4